Loch Doire nam Mart, also known as Loch Durinemart or Loch Durinemast, is a small, lowland, freshwater loch on the Ardtornish Estate on the Morvern peninsula in the Scottish Highlands. The loch was surveyed on 18 August 1904 by James Murray as part of Sir John Murray's Bathymetrical Survey of Fresh-Water Lochs of Scotland 1897-1909.

The loch holds native wild brown trout and permits are required to fish the loch.

References 

Doire nam Mart
Doire nam Mart